The 2010 Chicago Fire season was the club's 15th year of existence, their 13th season in Major League Soccer, and 13th consecutive year in the top-flight of American soccer.

Squad 
As of October 23, 2010

Transfers

In

Out

Formation 

Starting XI vs. Chivas USA on Oct. 23:

Club

Management

Kits

Review

March 

Chicago began their twelfth Major League Soccer regular season on the road the first two weeks with a match against the New York Red Bulls on March 27, 2010 and the Colorado Rapids on April 3, 2010 followed by their first home match against San Jose Earthquakes on April 10, 2010.

May 
The Chicago Fire participated in the first ever Chicago Sister Cities International Cup. A friendly tournament hosted by the Fire.

July 
Fire terminate loan agreement with Leon F.C. for the rights of Julio Martinez

August 
The Fire trade for Freddie Ljungberg (from Seattle) and also sign Nery Castillo from Shakhtar Donetsk.
The Fire trade away Justin Mapp and Tim Ward for allocation money and to clear roster spots.

Competitions
MLS – 10th Overall
MLS Cup – Did not qualify
U.S. Open Cup – 3rd round
SuperLiga – Group Stage

League table 

Conference

Overall

Results summary

Match results

MLS regular season

March

April

May

June

July

August

September

October

International Friendly

U.S. Open Cup

Sister Cities Cup 

Semi-Final Match

Third Place Match

SuperLiga

References

Chicago Fire FC seasons
Chicago Fire
Chicago Fire
2010 in sports in Illinois